Jorge Humberto López Portillo Basave (born 29 March 1974) is a Mexican politician from the Institutional Revolutionary Party. From 2009 to 2012 he served as Deputy of the LXI Legislature of the Mexican Congress representing Jalisco. In 2011 he was named as the first Secretary of a newly created Office for Migrant Affairs in the party.

He was the general director of Exportadora de Sal S.A. from July 2013 to December 2014, and was prosecuted for purchasing a new barge without the proper authorization from the administrative committee.

References

1974 births
Living people
Politicians from Jalisco
Institutional Revolutionary Party politicians
21st-century Mexican politicians
Members of the Chamber of Deputies (Mexico) for Jalisco